Looty Pijamini (born 1953) is an Inuit artist. He lives and works in Grise Fiord, Nunavut.

Pijamini was born November 14, 1953, in Clyde River, Nunavut, and moved to Grise Fiord in 1961, when his father, who was a special constable in the Royal Canadian Mounted Police, was posted there.

Along with Simeonie Amagoalik in Resolute, Pijamini was commissioned by the Canadian government to build a monument to the High Arctic relocation which took place in 1955. Pijamini's monument, located in Grise Fiord, depicts a woman with a young boy and a husky, with the woman somberly looking out towards the ocean. Pijamini said that he intentionally made them look melancholy because the relocation was not a happy event. The monument was unveiled in September 2010, and received praise from the Canadian Broadcasting Corporation.

References

1953 births
Living people
People from Clyde River
Inuit from the Northwest Territories
Artists from Nunavut
Inuit sculptors
20th-century Canadian sculptors
21st-century Canadian sculptors
Inuit from Nunavut
People from Grise Fiord